Franz Michael Bohnen (2 May 1887 – 26 April 1965) was a German bass baritone opera singer and actor. Bohnen was very popular in the Roaring Twenties.

Life

Michael Bohnen was born in Cologne.  He trained in opera singing at the Hochschule für Musik Köln with composer and conductor Fritz Steinbach and Rudolf Schulz-Dornburg and with a private tutor, making his debut in 1910 at the Stadttheater Düsseldorf. In 1912, he appeared at the Hoftheater Wiesbaden. From 1912 onwards he was a member of the Hofoper Berlin and from 1914 onwards appeared regularly at the Bayreuther Festspiele. He served in the early years of the First World War, but was recalled to the Berliner Hofoper in 1916. In 1922 he sang at the Metropolitan Opera in New York. In 1925, he played Baron Ochs von Lerchenau in a film of the opera Der Rosenkavalier. After the war, Bohnen joined the Metropolitan Opera in New York in 1922, and spent 1933 to 1934 in Buenos Aires. He had an affair with La Jana and entered into a long correspondence with her, now held by his granddaughter.

In Germany, he also became popular as a spoken-word actor. In 1934, he returned to Berlin, first to the Staatsoper, then from 1935 to 1945 in the Deutschen Oper Berlin and after the end of the Second World War until 1947 as intendant of these halls (where he still sang until 1951) and as president of the Kammer der Kunstschaffenden. His time as intendant at the Städtischen Oper Berlin had to come to an end due to an accusation by his pupil, the tenor Hans Beirer, during the denazification process. His rehabilitation during the following years was slow, even though Beirer's accusation was quickly revealed as false. Bohnen thus died in complete poverty, with only a small wage from the city of Berlin. Michael Bohnen died on a Monday of acute heart failure in his Berlin apartment on 26 April 1965, a week before his 78th birthday. He is buried in the Friedhof Heerstraße.

Partial filmography 
 The Mistress of the World (1919, serial), as Consul Madsen
 President Barrada (1920)
 The Adventurer (1922), as Van Hamm
 Lowlands (1922), as Sebastiano
 Der Rosenkavalier (1926), as Baron Ochs von Lerchenau
 Heads Up, Charley (1927), as John Jacob Bunjes
 The Gypsy Baron (1927), as Kálmán Zsupán
 Sajenko the Soviet (1928), as Sajenko
 Casanova (1928) as Casanova
 Victoria and Her Hussar (1931), as John Cunlight
 Viennese Waltz (1932)
 Gold (1934), as John Wills
 The Private Life of Louis XIV (1935), as King Louis XIV
 The King's Prisoner (1935), as King Augustus the Strong
 Augustus the Strong (1936), as King Augustus the Strong
 Mother Song (1937)
 The Immortal Heart (1939), as Martin Behaim
 The Rothschilds (1940), as William of Hesse
 Beloved Augustin (1940), as Emperor Leopold
 Münchhausen (1943), as Duke Charles of Brunswick

Honours 
 1957 Großes Bundesverdienstkreuz via Prof. Theodor Heuss
 1952 Goethe Preisträger
 Ehrenmitglied der Deutschen Oper Berlin
 Ehrenpensionär der Metropolitan Opera New York
 Ständige Ausstellung seines Familienwappenringes im Foyer der Metropolitan Opera New York
 Gedenktafel am Geburtshaus in Köln, Friesenwall 102
 Gedenktafel am Standort der alten Jugendstil Oper in Köln, Habsburgerring 13
 Gedenktafel am langjährigen Wohnhaus in Berlin, Kurfürstendamm 50
 Würdigung mit der Widmung einer Straße in Berlin Neukölln: "Michael-Bohnen-Ring“
 Ehrengrab auf dem Prominentenfriedhof Berlin Heerstraße.

References

External links 
 Michael Bohnen on filmportal.
 https://www.imdb.com/name/nm0092128/
 https://web.archive.org/web/20160303225340/https://portal.d-nb.de/opac.htm?query=Woe%3D116232862&method=simpleSearch
 http://www.cyranos.ch/smbohn-d.htm
 Photographs and literature on Michael Bohnen

1887 births
1965 deaths
German male stage actors
German male film actors
German male silent film actors
Operatic bass-baritones
Musicians from Cologne
Commanders Crosses of the Order of Merit of the Federal Republic of Germany
20th-century German male actors
20th-century German male opera singers